Huwaida or Howaida is a given name and surname and may refer to:

Huwayda, Lebanese singer and actress, daughter of Lebanese singer Sabah
Huwaida Arraf (born 1976), Palestinian American activist, lawyer and co-founder of the International Solidarity Movement
Arash Howaida, Afghani singer, son of Zahir Howaida
Zahir Howaida (1946–2012), Afghan musician